Amalie Marie Joachim (née Schneeweiss; 10 May 1839 – 3 February 1899) was an Austrian-German contralto, working in opera and concert and as voice teacher. She was the wife of the violinist Joseph Joachim, and a friend of Clara Schumann and Johannes Brahms, with whom she made international tours.

Career 
Born Amalie Marie Schneeweiss in Marburg an der Drau, Austrian Empire, she was the daughter of Franz Max Schneeweiss and his wife Eleonore, née Lindes. The family moved to Graz in the early 1850s. She appeared on stage from age 14, under the stage name Amalie Weiss. She later worked in Vienna at the Kärntnertortheater. In April 1862, she was engaged by the Opernhaus Hannover, where she had appeared as a guest several times. There, she met the concert master Joseph Joachim, whom she married on 10 June 1863 in the Schlosskirche. The couple had six children. 

With her marriage, she retired from the stage, but she still performed as a concert singer, often together with her husband and Clara Schumann, a friend. They toured extensively, up to London. She participated in choral performances of the Sing-Akademie zu Berlin up to 1870, and became one of their honorary members.

Johannes Brahms dedicated his Two Songs for Voice, Viola and Piano (Op. 91) to Amalie and her husband, which they could perform together. He wrote one song for their wedding and the baptism of their first son, who was named Johannes after Brahms, and the other decades later with the intention to help the couple's troubled marriage.

Amalie was also a voice teacher and, on the recommendation of Johannes Brahms, Marie Fillunger studied under her at the Hochschule in Berlin in 1874.

The marriage was dissolved after 21 years, after the jealous Joachim had accused her of adultery. Brahms defended her position. She performed more often after the divorce, to make money. Her focus was on Lied and oratorio. She was often accompanied by the pianist . In 1885 and 1886 she toured with Laura Rappoldi from Dresden. On 1 February 1888, she premiered in Berlin at a Liederabend (recital) in Berlin the second song of Fünf Lieder, Op. 105 by Johannes Brahms. She founded a school of singing (Gesangsschule) in Berlin.

She died in 1899 in Berlin after surgery and was buried on the Kaiser Wilhelm Memorial Cemetery. Her grave had the status Ehrengrab (Honorary grave) until 2015.

Literature 
 Joachim, Ehepaar Österreichisches musiklexicon online
 Joachim, Amalie; geb. Schneeweiß, Ps. Weiß (1839–1898), Sängerin Österreichisches Biographisches Lexikon 1815–1950
 Friedrich Blume: Die Musik in Geschichte und Gegenwart. Allgemeine Enzyklopädie der Musik, unter Mitarbeit zahlreicher Musikforscher des In- und Auslandes, vol. 7
 Karl-Josef Kutsch, Leo Riemens, unter Mitwirkung von Hansjörg Rost: Großes Sängerlexikon, vol. 2, M–Z, Bern: Francke, 1997, column 3169
  (ed.): Sophie & Co. Bedeutende Frauen Hannovers. Biographische Portraits, Hannover: Fackelträger-Verlag, 1991, pp. 239ff
 Beatrix Borchard: Stimme und Geige. Amalie und Joseph Joachim. Biographie und Interpretationsgeschichte, in Wiener Veröffentlichungen zur Musikgeschichte, vol. 5, 2nd ed., Wien: Böhlau Wien, 
 Hugo Thielen: Weiss (eigtl. Schneeweiß), Amalie, in: Hannoversches Biographisches Lexikon, pp. 380ff
 Hugo Thielen: Weiss, Amalie, in: Stadtlexikon Hannover, p. 663

References

External links 

 Joachim (Weiß, Schneeweiß), Amalie Bayerisches Musiker Lexikon Online
 Amalie Joachim bei MUGI – "Musik und Gender im Internet"
 Biographische Informationen zum Ehepaar Joachim
 Barbara Hahn: Donnerschlag. Aus / Er geigt. Sie singt. Geschichte einer Ehe Die Zeit, 8 December 2005

German contraltos
1839 births
1899 deaths
Musicians from Maribor
Austrian emigrants to Germany
19th-century women musicians